Kan Kvarchia is a member of the People's Assembly of Abkhazia.

Political career
In the March 2012 elections, Kvarchia successfully ran for a seat of the 5th convocation of the People's Assembly of Abkhazia in constituency no. 31 (Tkvarcheli), winning the first round with 39.16% of the votes against three other candidates, and defeating incumbent MP Aleksandr Chengelia in the run-off.

On 7 October 2014, Kvarchia was elected with 27 to 4 votes (out of 31 present) as chairman of the Committee for Agrarian Policy, Natural Resources and Ecology, replacing Nodik Kvitsinia, who was under investigation, and would later be convicted, for the murder of Russian businessman Sergei Klemantovich and his partner Oksana Skarednova.

Assassination attempt
On 17 October 2016, at around 7:10, a man was killed in an explosion near the office of the Abkhazian State TV and Radio. The investigation revealed that the bomb had detonated early, killing the would-be assassin, identified as a Russian citizen named SL Tarasenko, and that Kvarchia had been his intended target. On 2 November, police detained Adgur Korsentia, a member of the political council of opposition party Amtsakhara, on suspicion of involvement in the attempted attack. On 5 November, Sukhumi City Court granted his continued detention pending the investigation. On 12 November, this was confirmed on appeal.

References

5th convocation of the People's Assembly of Abkhazia
Living people
Year of birth missing (living people)